Gorky Park (international title), aka GP, or Парк Горького (Russian title) is a Soviet, American and Russian hard rock band formed in 1987 by musician, composer and producer Stas Namin at his producing centre SNC in Moscow. It is the only Soviet and Russian band to have conquered the MTV and Billboard charts and become world famous.

The main springboard to the heights of popularity in the USSR, United States and other countries was the band's participation in the Moscow International Peace Festival, organised by Stas Namin and Doc McGhee. It took place on August 12–13, 1989 at the Luzhniki Stadium under the motto "Rock Against Drugs" and was broadcast on MTV in 59 countries. Gorky Park participated in the festival alongside Bon Jovi, Ozzy Osbourne, Mötley Crüe, Scorpions, Cinderella and Skid Row. After the festival, in August 1989, US PolyGram released GP's first and only studio album of the same name, Gorky Park, recorded entirely in English by the original band, which entered the 1989 US Billboard 200 chart and brought the band worldwide fame.

In the original line-up, with lead vocalist Nikolay Noskov and general producer Stas Namin, the group lasted only three and a half years. In 1990, when Namin sent Gorky Park to its first US tour, there was a conflict in the group, and it broke up.

After 30 years, Stas Namin revived his project, and on August 28, 2022  the first concert performance of the band in the new line-up took place at the Russian rock festival "SNC. 35 Years" in Moscow Gorky Park. The special guest at this performance was the leader-vocalist of the original Gorky Park, Nikolay Noskov. He passed the baton to the new musicians, who conquered the audience with their professionalism and drive and received offers to tour in Russia and abroad. The new line-up of GP are musicians from Russia and the US, singing about Love, Peace and Freedom.

History
In 1987, guitarist Alexey Belov, vocalist Nikolay Noskov (both from Moskva band), bassist Alexander "Big Sasha" Minkov, guitarist Yan Yanenkov, and drummer Alexander Lvov (formerly from Aria) came together to form Gorky Park. Stas Namin, a famous 1970s Soviet musician, became the band's manager. Because Mikhail Gorbachev lifted the censorship, many underground rock bands, including Gorky Park, became able to gain wider popularity. Later that year the band left Russia for the United States in search of a record deal.

In the U.S. the band soon made some connections in the record business. One of the first people to take notice was musician Frank Zappa. Jon Bon Jovi and Richie Sambora also helped them to secure a deal with Mercury Records.

The band released a self-titled debut album in 1989, featuring initials "GP" stylized as a hammer and sickle on the cover. With the fall of the Iron Curtain and a growing interest in Soviets to western countries, Gorky Park soon became widely known. The band seemed to be a kind of symbol of American-Russian friendship. The band's first video, "Bang", received MTV rotation. Their next two singles "Try to Find Me" and a collaboration with Bon Jovi "Peace in Our Time" received rotation on mainstream radio stations.

Gorky Park participated in that year's Moscow Music Peace Festival alongside Bon Jovi, Mötley Crüe, Skid Row, Cinderella, Ozzy Osbourne and Scorpions. Gorky Park joined the other acts from the Moscow Music Peace Festival in the compilation album Stairway to Heaven/Highway to Hell. This album included each band performing one song from an artist who died from, or a band who lost a member to, drug problems. Gorky Park's contribution was a cover of The Who's "My Generation".

The band continued into 1990 touring with Bon Jovi and performing at the Goodwill Games opening ceremony. Gorky Park live shows often featured the band dressed in traditional Russian style, waving Soviet and American flags. In 1991, the band received Scandinavian Grammis award as the best new international act.

As Perestroika era came to its end, the group's fame in America subsided rather quickly. Nikolai Noskov left the band in 1990, but Gorky Park remained active and kept releasing albums in the 1990s, with Minkov taking over as lead vocalist. 1992's Moscow Calling, produced by Fee Waybill, sold 500,000 copies outside the US. Their next album, Stare, was released in 1996, but only in Russia, followed up by promotional tour of the former USSR states. In 1998, the band released Protivofazza. In 1999, Nikolay Noskov joined for the first time in nine years to sing "Bang", also Alexander Minkov left the band and started his solo career under the stage name Alexander Marshall. Gorky Park was never officially claimed to disband, but have been inactive since 2001. Belov and Yanenkov continued to perform Gorky Park songs in their bands "Park Belova" (Belov Park) and "Muzykanty gruppy Gorky Park" (Musicians of the Gorky Park band). Line-up of that period: Alexey Belov (vocals, guitars), Yan Yanenkov (guitars), Alexander Bagnov (bass), Alexander Makin (drums).

Since then, Gorky Park made several brief reunions in festivals. In 2008, Gorky Park received Muz-TV award for contribution to Rock music and performed "Moscow Calling" with Alexander Minkov.

On November 18, 2012, the band played a special show in Crocus City Hall in Moscow to celebrate their 25th anniversary. Nikolay Noskov joined the band on stage for the first time since 1999 to sing "Bang".

Members 
Current lineup
 Oleg Izotov — lead guitar, lead vocals (2022—present)
 Pavel Popov — rhythm guitar, lead vocals (2022—present)
 Alexey Baev — rhythm and lead guitars (2022—present)
 Marco Mendoza — bass guitar, backing vocals (2022—present)
 Kenny Aronoff — drums (2022—present)

Past members
 Nikolai Noskov — lead vocals (1987—1990, 1999, 2012, 2022)
 Aleksandr Marshal – bass guitar (1987–1998; 1999, 2008, 2009, 2012, 2013, 2015, 2019), backing vocals (1987-1992; 1999, 2012), lead vocals (1992-1998, 2008, 2009, 2012, 2013, 2015, 2019)
 Alexey Belov – lead guitar, backing vocals (1987—1998; 1999, 2008, 2009, 2012, 2013, 2015, 2019), keyboards (1989—1994), rhythm guitar (2019)
 Yan Yanenkov — rhythm guitar, occasional backing vocals (1987—1998; 1999, 2008, 2009, 2012, 2013, 2015)
 Alexander "Little Sasha" Lvov — drums, backing vocals (studio) (1987–1998, 1999, 2006, 2008, 2009, 2012, 2013, 2015, 2019)
 Nikolai Kuzminykh – keyboards (1994—1998)

Timeline

Discography

Studio albums 

"—" – Album did not chart or was not released in country

Singles

Popular culture 

 A snippet of "Bang" was used in HBO's Barry season-one finale. The song was played in the scene where the Chechens were readying their weapons.

References

External links 

Official Website

 
Glam metal musical groups
Musical groups established in 1987
Russian hard rock musical groups
Soviet rock music groups